Dhofari Arabic, also known as Dhofari or Zofari, is a variety of Arabic spoken around Salalah in Oman's Dhofar Governorate. It has the ISO 639-3 language code "adf".

Nomadic and sedentary communities living in the area speak Dhofari Arabic as a first language, second language, or lingua franca, with varying degrees of fluency.

See also
 Peninsular Arabic

References

Bibliography 
 
 

Arabic languages
Arabs in Oman
Mashriqi Arabic
Peninsular Arabic
Languages of Oman